Atherton F.C. was an English football club located in Atherton, in Lancashire. The club spent most of its history in the Lancashire Combination.

History
The club, then known as Atherton Church House, joined the Lancashire Combination as founder members of new Division 2 in 1903. In the 1904–05 season, they finished in fourth place and earned promotion to the First Division. The club changed their name to Atherton F.C. in 1906 and continued in the Lancashire Combination, dropping back to the Second Division in 1909. Third place in 1913 gained them promotion back to the top division, where they remained until the First World War.

After the war, the Lancashire Combination reverted to one division, in which Atherton continued to play until 1930 when they left.

The club only once entered the FA Cup, in 1906–07, when they lost 4–1  to Oldham Athletic in a replay after a 1–1 draw in the fourth qualifying round.

See also
Atherton Collieries A.F.C.
Atherton Laburnum Rovers F.C.

References

Defunct football clubs in England
Atherton, Greater Manchester
Defunct football clubs in Greater Manchester
Defunct football clubs in Lancashire
Association football clubs disestablished in the 20th century